Culeolus elegans is a species of ascidian tunicates in the family Pyuridae. It is found in New Caledonia (Western South Pacific).

References

External links 

Stolidobranchia
Animals described in 1991
Fauna of New Caledonia